The 2014 AFC President's Cup was the tenth and the last edition of the AFC President's Cup, a football competition organized by the Asian Football Confederation (AFC) for clubs from "emerging countries" in Asia. Balkan were the defending champions, but failed to qualify for the tournament.

On 25 November 2013, the AFC Competitions Committee proposed that the 2014 AFC President's Cup to be the last edition of the competition. Starting from 2015, league champions of "emerging countries" are eligible to participate in the AFC Cup qualifying play-off.

In the final, HTTU Aşgabat of Turkmenistan defeated Rimyongsu of North Korea 2–1, and became the second consecutive team from Turkmenistan to win the AFC President's Cup.

Venues

Teams

The AFC laid out the procedure for deciding the participating associations, with the final decision to be made by the AFC on 26 November 2013. The following changes to the list of participating associations may be made from the 2013 AFC President's Cup if the AFC approves the following applications made by any association:
An association originally participating in the AFC President's Cup may apply to participate in the 2014 AFC Cup.
An association originally not participating in any AFC club competitions may apply to participate in the 2014 AFC President's Cup.

The following changes in the participating associations were made compared to the previous year:
Kyrgyzstan and Palestine clubs' participation were upgraded from the AFC President's Cup to the AFC Cup starting from 2014 by the AFC.
Clubs from North Korea were approved to participate in the AFC President's Cup for the first time in 2014.

Each participating association was given one entry. The following teams entered the competition.

Notes

Schedule
The schedule of the competition was as follows.
Group stage: 1–11 May 2014
Final stage: 20–26 September 2014

Group stage
The draw for the group stage was held on 28 March 2014, 16:00 UTC+8, at the AFC House in Kuala Lumpur. The eleven teams were drawn into two groups of four and one group of three. Each group was played on a single round-robin basis at a centralized venue. The winners and runners-up of each group advanced to the final stage.

Tiebreakers
The teams are ranked according to points (3 points for a win, 1 point for a tie, 0 points for a loss). If tied on points, tiebreakers are applied in the following order:
Greater number of points obtained in the group matches between the teams concerned
Goal difference resulting from the group matches between the teams concerned
Greater number of goals scored in the group matches between the teams concerned
Goal difference in all the group matches
Greater number of goals scored in all the group matches
Penalty shoot-out if only two teams are involved and they are both on the field of play
Fewer score calculated according to the number of yellow and red cards received in the group matches (1 point for a single yellow card, 3 points for a red card as a consequence of two yellow cards, 3 points for a direct red card, 4 points for a yellow card followed by a direct red card)
Drawing of lots

Group A

Matches were played in Sri Lanka (all times UTC+5:30).

Group B

Matches were played in the Philippines (all times UTC+8).

Group C

Matches were played in Mongolia (all times UTC+8).

Final stage
The draw for the final stage, played at a centralized venue, was held on 25 July 2014, 12:00 UTC+8, at the AFC House in Kuala Lumpur, Malaysia. The six teams were drawn into two groups of three. Each group was played on a single round-robin basis, with the same ranking rules as the group stage. The winners of each group advanced to the final. The final was played as a single match, with extra time and penalty shoot-out used to decide the winner if necessary.

The final stage was played in Sri Lanka (all times UTC+5:30).

Group A

Group B

Final

Awards

Top scorers

See also
2014 AFC Cup
2014 AFC Champions League

References

External links
AFC President's Cup. the-AFC.com

3
2014
2014 in Mongolian sport
2013–14 in Sri Lankan football
2014 in Philippine football
2014